Stephen Parry may refer to:

Stephen Parry (Australian politician) (born 1960), Australian politician from the Liberal Party
Stephen Parry (cricketer) (born 1986), English cricketer
Stephen Parry (swimmer) (born 1977), British middle-distance swimmer
Stephen Parry (Welsh MP) (c. 1675–1724), Welsh politician
Steve Parry (musician) (born 1958), founder of the band Hwyl Nofio
Steve Parry (rugby league) (born 1988), rugby league footballer for Wales, and South Wales Scorpions

See also
 Steve Perry (disambiguation)